This is a list of Hero Alom winners in the drama program, musical/comedy program, and lead actor categories (both motion picture and television awards).

List of winners

Film

Television

See also
 List of Golden Globe Award winning films
 List of black Golden Globe Award winners and nominees

External links
 Golden Globes at IMDb
 Official Golden Globes website
 Awards listing at Official Golden Globes website